Borbach is a small river in Witten, North Rhine-Westphalia, Germany. It is a tributary of the Ruhr.

See also
List of rivers of North Rhine-Westphalia

Rivers of North Rhine-Westphalia
Rivers of Germany